Reynolds Joseph "Ren" Kelly (November 18, 1899 – August 24, 1963) was an American pitcher in Major League Baseball who played in one game for the Philadelphia Athletics on September 18, 1923.  In that game, he pitched seven innings in relief, gave up seven hits, two earned runs, while walking four batters, and striking out one.

Kelly was born and raised in San Francisco, and was the California High School player of the year for 1919, when he attended San Francisco's Polytechnic High School.

Coach Christy Mathewson like his size, assortment of pitches, and his accurate pitching, but he did not make the team. His uncle, Bill Lange, and cousin, Rich Chiles, also played Major League Baseball. Kelly died at the age of 63 in Millbrae, California and is interred at Oak Hill Memorial Park in San Jose, California.

References

External links

1899 births
1963 deaths
Major League Baseball pitchers
Baseball players from San Francisco
Philadelphia Athletics players
Burials at Oak Hill Memorial Park